The Scottish Amateur Cup is a nationwide knockout tournament supported and organised by the Scottish Amateur Football Association. The Scottish Amateur Cup is contested by hundreds of football clubs every year. The first and second rounds are regionalised.

Since 2015, the winners of the Amateur Cup are invited to compete in the following season's senior Scottish Cup.

List of Winners
This list is incomplete; you can help by adding missing items with reliable sources.

References

External links
 Scottish Amateur Football Association
 List of finals at Scottish Football Historical Archive http://sfha.org.uk/amateur.htm

6
1909 establishments in Scotland
Amateur association football in Scotland
Recurring sporting events established in 1909